Cao Fang may refer to:

 Cao Fang, formally known as Duke Li of Shaoling, the third emperor of the state of Cao Wei
 Cao Fang (singer), a Chinese indie pop singer-songwriter

See also
 Caofang (disambiguation)